The individual dressage at the 2014 World Equestrian Games in Normandy was held at Stade Michel d'Ornano from 25 to 29 August.

Great Britain's Charlotte Dujardin won gold medal in both Grand Prix Special and Grand Prix Freestyle while Helen Langehanenberg won silver medal in both events for Germany. The bronze in Special was won by Kristina Sprehe of Germany while the bronze in Freestyle went to Adelinde Cornelissen representing the Netherlands.

Competition format

The team and individual dressage competitions used the same results. Dressage had three phases. The first phase was the Grand Prix. Top 30 individuals advanced to the second phase, the Grand Prix Special where the first individual medals were awarded. The last set of medals in dressage at the 2014 World Equestrian Games was awarded after the third phase, the Grand Prix Freestyle where top 15 combinations competed.

Schedule

All times are Central European Summer Time (UTC+2)

Results

References

2014 in equestrian